Eveleen Kejarukua (born 16 September 1993) is a Namibian cricketer. She made her Women's Twenty20 International (WT20I) debut for the Namibia women's cricket team on 23 August 2018, against Lesotho, in the 2018 Botswana Cricket Association Women's T20I Series.

In August 2019, she was named in Namibia's squad for the 2019 ICC Women's World Twenty20 Qualifier tournament in Scotland.

References

External links
 

1993 births
Living people
Namibian women cricketers
Namibia women Twenty20 International cricketers
Place of birth missing (living people)